Lyubers (люберы lyubery or любера lyubera) were a youth group in the late 1970s and early 1980s in USSR, starting in Lyubertsy, a suburb of Moscow. It was dedicated to an athletic lifestyle, engaging in activities such as bodybuilding, boxing, athletics, gymnastic exercises and/or other forms of sport.

History
It became active during the period of Glasnost in the late 1980s in the Soviet Union. It was a youth group whose aim was to "cleanse" Soviet society of the influences of various Western subcultures which they viewed as decadent, and often attacked other youth, mainly in major cities such as Moscow. However, they always held to certain principles such as fair fight and to never attack women and couples. The "Lyubers" were against outwardly informal dress groups such as hippies, punks and metalheads but also held strong anti-fascist views and had conflicts with the emerging Neo-nazi groups. The name "Lyubers" ("Люберы") comes the Moscow industrial suburb of Lyubertsy. As the Perestroika program opened up the market economy, some of the Lyubers turned to racketeering and organized crime syndicates, this however was swallowed up by a larger group in the 1990s.

References

Jim Riordan, Soviet Studies, Vol. 40, No. 4 (Oct. 1988)  pp 556–572

Society of the Soviet Union
Russian youth culture
1970s neologisms
Crime in the Soviet Union
1970s in Russia
1980s in Russia